The 2013–14 PlusLiga was the 78th season of the Polish Volleyball Championship, the 14th season as a professional league organized by the Professional Volleyball League SA under the supervision of the Polish Volleyball Federation.

The number of teams competing in this season was increased from 10 to 12.

PGE Skra Bełchatów won their 8th title of the Polish Champions.

Regular season

|}

1st round

|}

2nd round

|}

3rd round

|}

4th round

|}

5th round

|}

6th round

|}

7th round

|}

8th round

|}

9th round

|}

10th round

|}

11th round

|}

12th round

|}

13th round

|}

14th round

|}

15th round

|}

16th round

|}

17th round

|}

18th round

|}

19th round

|}

20th round

|}

21st round

|}

22nd round

|}

Playoffs

1st round
Quarterfinals
(to 3 victories)

|}

|}

|}

|}

2nd round
Semifinals
(to 3 victories)

|}

|}

5th–8th places
(to 2 victories)

|}

|}

3rd round
11th place
(to 2 victories)

|}

9th place
(to 2 victories)

|}

7th place
(to 2 victories)

|}

5th place
(to 3 victories)

|}

3rd place
(to 3 victories)

|}

Finals
(to 3 victories)

|}

Final standings

Squads

See also
 2013–14 CEV Champions League
 2013–14 CEV Cup

References

External links
 Official website 

PlusLiga
PlusLiga
PlusLiga
Plusliga
Plusliga